Mohamed Adli Roushdi (21 July 1921 – 28 April 2016) was an Egyptian gymnast. He competed in eight events at the 1948 Summer Olympics.

References

External links
 

1921 births
2016 deaths
Egyptian male artistic gymnasts
Olympic gymnasts of Egypt
Gymnasts at the 1948 Summer Olympics
Place of birth missing
Egyptian expatriates in the United States
20th-century Egyptian people